St. Julian's School is a private British international school, located in Carcavelos, Cascais Municipality, on the Portuguese Riviera, in the Greater Lisbon region. It is housed at Quinta de Santo António, a historic Pombaline quinta (estate) near Carcavelos Beach.

History

St. Julian's is a British international private school located in the parish of Carcavelos e Parede, in Cascais, close to Lisbon, Portugal. The school takes its name from São Julião da Barra Fortress, overlooking nearby Carcavelos beach, originally erected in the mid-16th century to keep the British, among other raiders, out of the Tagus estuary.

The school opened on 25 November 1932 in the buildings, including residential palace, of the 18th-century estate founded by José Francisco da Cruz, treasurer to King D. José I. This academic year, 2022/23, school is celebrating its 90 year anniversary. 

At the time of the school's founding, the palace and grounds were the property of the British Eastern Telegraph Company, which had installed and maintained a system of submarine cables that helped to transform global communication at the turn-of-the-century.

Academics
St Julian's has just over 1,200 students from age three to age 18.

The schools is divided into two linguistic sections:
International (British) section, where the language of instruction is English, runs from Nursery (age 3) to Year 13 (age 18). Students broadly follow the National Curriculum for England leading to IGCSEs in Years 10 and 11 (Key Stage 4) and the International Baccalaureate in Years 12 and 13.  
Portuguese language section, runs from Primeiro Ano to Nono Ano (Ninth Grade, age 15).

The final two years of the school are given through the International Baccalaureate (IB) program.

Organisation
St Julian's is run by a not-for-profit association, whose 50+ members, as trustees, appoint the Board of Governors. The Board in-turn appoint the Head and Bursar. 

St Julian's School is jointly accredited by the Council of International Schools (COBIS) and the New England Association of Schools and Colleges (NEASC), and the Head is a member of the Heads' Conference (HMC). The School is also a member of the Council of British International Schools.

Just under half the students at St. Julian's are Portuguese, with British the next largest nationality, and more than 40 other countries represented.

Notable alumni
Afonso, Prince of Beira
Pedro Pinto, journalist 
Paula Rego, artist
Mia Rose, singer
Ana Free, singer (Class of 2005)
Daniela Ruah, actress
Paolo Marinou-Blanco, film director 
Kasper Schmeichel, footballer (Class of 2005)
Afonso Taira, footballer
Luka Zahovic, footballer
Eric Dier, footballer
April Ivy, Singer (Class of 2017)
Pedro Lucas, rugby union player for the Portugal national team (Class of 2019)

References

External links

 St Julian's official website
 St Julian's School IB information
 HMC entry for St Julian’s School

International Baccalaureate schools in Portugal
International schools in Lisbon
British international schools in Europe
Educational institutions established in 1932
1932 establishments in Portugal
Education in Cascais